The following are the national records in athletics in Mauritius maintained by its national athletics federation: Mauritius Athletics Association (MAA).

Outdoor
Key to tables:

+ = en route to a longer distance

h = hand timing

OT = oversized track (> 200m in circumference)

Men

Women

Indoor

Men

Women

Notes

References
General
Mauritian Absolute Records – Men 2 September 2019 updated
Mauritian Absolute Records – Women 15 August 2020 updated
Specific

External links
MAA web site

Mauritius
national records
Athletics
Athletics